Thallarevu Mandal is one of the 21 mandals in Kakinada district of Andhra Pradesh. As per census 2011, there are 13 villages.

Demographics 
Thallarevu Mandal has total population of 82,799 as per the Census 2011 out of which 41,438 are males while 41,361 are females and the Average Sex Ratio of Thallarevu Mandal is 998. The total literacy rate of Thallarevu Mandal is 70.58%. The male literacy rate is 66.13% and the female literacy rate is 59.49%.

Towns & Villages

Villages 

Chollangi
Chollangi Peta
G. Vemavaram
Injaram
Koringa
Latchipalem
Neelapalle
P. Mallavaram
Patavala
Pillanka
Polekurru
Sunkarapalem
Uppangala

See also 
List of mandals in Andhra Pradesh

References 

Mandals in Kakinada district
Mandals in Andhra Pradesh